Lakeview is an unincorporated community in Todd County, in the U.S. state of South Dakota.

History
A post office called Lakeview was established in 1913, and remained in operation until 1955. The community was so named for a lake (since drained) near the town site.

References

Unincorporated communities in Todd County, South Dakota
Unincorporated communities in South Dakota